Côte-Sainte-Catherine station is a Montreal Metro station in the borough of Côte-des-Neiges–Notre-Dame-de-Grâce in Montreal, Quebec, Canada. It is operated by the Société de transport de Montréal (STM) and serves the  Orange Line. It is located in the Snowdon neighbourhood. The station opened on January 4, 1982, and briefly served as the western terminus of the Orange Line, replacing Snowdon station until Plamondon station opened in June of that year.

Overview

The station is a normal side platform station, built in tunnel with a central mezzanine built in trench, and one entrance.

The station was designed by Gilbert Sauvé and contains murals and reliefs by the architect.

In June 2010 the station was closed for renovations and reopened in August.

Origin of the name
This station is named for the chemin de la Côte-Sainte-Catherine, the main street of the former village of Outremont, which had been called Côte Sainte-Catherine since the 17th century. The station, road, and côte were all named for Saint Catherine of Alexandria.

Connecting bus routes

Nearby points of interest

Sir Mortimer B. Davis Jewish General Hospital
Segal Centre for Performing Arts (formerly the Saidye Bronfman Centre)
Centre communautaire juif
Grand rabbinat du Québec
Talmud Torahs unis de Montréal
Communauté sépharade de Montréal
 Montreal Holocaust Museum
 Mackenzie King Park

References

External links

Côte-Sainte-Catherine Station - official web page
Côte-Sainte-Catherine metro geo location
Montreal by Metro, metrodemontreal.com

Orange Line (Montreal Metro)
Côte-des-Neiges–Notre-Dame-de-Grâce
Railway stations in Canada opened in 1982
1982 establishments in Quebec